South Australian high schools that offer specialised courses and programs. Some schools have a selection process for entry into their special programs.

Aberfoyle Park High School, Ignite: Students with High Intellectual Potential 
Adelaide Botanic High School, Science, Technology, Engineering and Mathematics (STEM)
Adelaide High School, Language, Cricket, Rowing and centre of hearing impaired
Australian Science and Mathematics School, Science/Maths 
Blackwood High School, Netball
Brighton Secondary School, Music and Volleyball
Charles Campbell Secondary School, Dance/Drama/Music/Performing Arts
Glenunga International High School, Ignite: Students with High Intellectual Potential
Golden Grove High School, Dance/Drama
Grant High School, Baseball
Heathfield High School, Volleyball
Henley High School, Sport and Physical Education
Marryatville High School, Music and Tennis
Mount Gambier High School, athletics, cricket, Australian rules football and netball
Pasadena High School, Basketball
Playford International College formerly Fremont–Elizabeth City High School, Music
Seaton High School, Baseball, (previously Students with High Intellectual Potential (SHIP))
Seaview High School, Tennis
The Heights School 
Underdale High School, Soccer, music, dancing and choir
Urrbrae Agricultural High School, Agriculture
Wirreanda High School, Sport and Physical Education
Woodville High School, Music

The four Special Interest Music Centres cover four distinct geographical areas of Adelaide, and were set up in the respective schools over a two-year period: Brighton and Marryatville High Schools (1976), Woodville High School (1977) and Fremont-Elizabeth City High School (1978).

Other specialist schools
Australian Science and Mathematics School, Science and Mathematics
Gleeson College, Football (Soccer)

External links
Special Interest courses and programs (sa.gov.au)

Notes

 
Public schools in South Australia
Lists of schools in South Australia
Lists of special schools